Tinetti is a surname. Notable people with the surname include: 

Giovanna Tinetti (born 1972), Italian physicist
Jan Tinetti (born 1968), New Zealand politician
Mary Tinetti, American physician

See also
Tonetti